Herichthys carpintis, the lowland cichlid, pearlscale cichlid, is a species of cichlid.

It is endemic to eastern Mexico where it occurs in the Pánuco River drainage, and the Soto La Marina River in northeastern Mexico, its type locality is the Laguna del Carpinte, near Tampico in Tamaulipas, which is alluded to in the specific name.

It reaches a maximum size of  SL.

References

carp
Endemic fish of Mexico
Freshwater fish of Mexico
Natural history of San Luis Potosí
Natural history of Tamaulipas
Cichlid fish of North America
Fish described in 1899
Pánuco River
Taxa named by David Starr Jordan